Below are the squads for the 2018 AFF Women's Championship, hosted by Indonesia, which is taking place between 30 June - 13 July 2018.

Group A

Australia U20
Head coach: Leah Blayney

The squad was announced on 20 June 2018.

Cambodia
Head coach: Meas Samoeun

Malaysia
Head coach: Jacob Joseph

The squad was announced on 28 June 2018.

Thailand
Head coach: Nuengrutai Srathongvian

Timor-Leste
Head coach:  Lee Min-young

Group B

Indonesia
Head coach: Satia Bagdja Ijatna.

Myanmar

Philippines
Head coach: Buda Bautista

Singapore
Head coach: K. Balagumaran

The squad was announced on 28 June 2018.

Vietnam
Head coach: Mai Đức Chung

References

Women's AFF Championship squads